Derbyshire County Cricket Club in 1938 was the cricket season when the English club Derbyshire had been playing for 67 years. It was their fortieth season in the County Championship and they came fifth.

1938 season

Derbyshire played 28 games in the County Championship, and one match against the touring Australians.  In the County Championship, they won eleven matches and lost eight to finish fifth, a drop of two places from the previous season. They also suffered a heavy defeat by the Australians.

Robin Buckston was in his second season as captain. Stan Worthington was top scorer, closely followed by Leslie Townsend. Tommy Mitchell took most wickets.

Thomas Hounsfield made his debut for the club in 1938 and went on to play one more season before World War II led to the suspension of the first class game..

Matches

Statistics

County Championship batting averages

County Championship bowling averages

Wicket-keeper

H Elliott Catches 52 Stumping 10

See also
Derbyshire County Cricket Club seasons
1938 English cricket season

References

1938 in English cricket
Derbyshire County Cricket Club seasons
English cricket seasons in the 20th century